Salinimicrobium sediminis is a Gram-negative bacterium from the genus of Salinimicrobium which has been isolated from deep-sea sediments.

References

Flavobacteria
Bacteria described in 2014